The historic Fullerton City Hall, at 237 W. Commonwealth Ave. in Fullerton, California, was built during 1939 to 1942.  It was designed in Mission Revival style by influential architect G. Stanley Wilson, and was made of poured concrete.  Ceramic tiles and terra cotta for the project were produced by Gladding, McBean and Company.

The current city hall, at 303 W. Commonwealth Avenue, is a different building.

The historic building has included the Fullerton Police Department, the Fullerton Jail and the Wayne H. Bornhoft Facility.  It has served as a city hall, a courthouse, and a meeting hall.

References

City and town halls on the National Register of Historic Places in California
Jails on the National Register of Historic Places in California
Police stations on the National Register of Historic Places
National Register of Historic Places in Orange County, California
Mission Revival architecture in California
Buildings and structures completed in 1942